Magliano in Toscana is a comune (municipality) in the Province of Grosseto in the Italian region Tuscany, located about  south of Florence and about  southeast of Grosseto.

Magliano in Toscana borders the following municipalities: Grosseto, Manciano, Orbetello, Scansano.

Nearby was found the Lead Plaque of Magliano.

Frazioni 
The municipality is formed by the municipal seat of Magliano and the two villages (frazioni) of Montiano and Pereta.

References

External links

 Official website